The 2023 Harvard Crimson men's volleyball team represents Harvard University in the 2023 NCAA Division I & II men's volleyball season. The Crimson, led by 13th year head coach Brian Baise, play their home games at Malkin Athletic Center. The Crimson are members of the EIVA. They were picked to finish fifth in the EIVA preseason poll.

Season highlights
Will be filled in as the season progresses.

Roster

Schedule
TV/Internet Streaming information:
All home games will be streamed on ESPN+. Most road games will also be streamed by the schools streaming service.

 *-Indicates conference match.
 Times listed are Eastern Time Zone.

Announcers for televised games
Sacred Heart: Bernie Picozzi 
Merrimack: No commentary
Ball State: Joey Lindstrom & Amber Seaman
Purdue Fort Wayne: 
North Greenville: 
McKendree: 
Daemen: 
Merrimack: 
Charleston (WV): 
Charleston (WV): 
Princeton: 
Princeton: 
St. Francis Brooklyn: 
LIU: 
UC Santa Barbara: 
Pepperdine: 
Sacred Heart: 
American International: 
Penn State: 
Penn State:  
NJIT: 
NJIT: 
George Mason: 
George Mason:

References

2023 in sports in Massachusetts
2023 NCAA Division I & II men's volleyball season
Harvard